Keith Martin Ball FRS FRSE (born 26 December 1960) is a mathematician and professor at the University of Warwick. He was scientific director of the International Centre for Mathematical Sciences (ICMS) from 2010 to 2014.

Education
Ball was educated at Berkhamsted School and Trinity College, Cambridge where he studied the Cambridge Mathematical Tripos and was awarded a Bachelor of Arts degree in mathematics in 1982 and a PhD in 1987 for research supervised by Béla Bollobás.

Research
Keith Ball's research is in the fields of functional analysis, high-dimensional and discrete geometry and information theory. He is the author of Strange Curves, Counting Rabbits, & Other Mathematical Explorations.

Awards and honours
Ball was elected a Fellow of the American Mathematical Society (AMS) in 2012 and a Fellow of the Royal Society (FRS) in 2013. His Royal Society citation reads

References

1960 births
Living people
People educated at Berkhamsted School
Alumni of Trinity College, Cambridge
Fellows of the Royal Society
Fellows of the American Mathematical Society
English mathematicians
Academics of the University of Warwick